Maccabi Ironi Jatt Al-Ahli was an Israeli football club based in Umm al-Fahm. The club played their home matches at the HaShalom Stadium.

History
The club founded in the 1990s. In 2007–08, the club won Liga Gimel Samaria division and were promoted to Liga Bet. In the following season, they won Liga Bet North A division, and promoted to Liga Alef. The 2009–10 season saw a third successive promotion as the club won Liga Alef North and promotion to Liga Leumit. Just a season later, the club was relegated to Liga Alef after finishing in the 15th place.

In the 2011–12 season of Liga Alef South, the club withdrew after playing 8 matches. as they failed to show up for two matches in a row, the Israel Football Association ceased the club's activity and their results were annulled.

Honours
Liga Alef
North Division champions: 2009–10
Liga Bet
North A Division champions: 2008–09
Liga Gimel
Samaria Division champions: 2007–08

References
Maccabi Ironi Jatt Al Ahli The Israel Football Association 

Association football clubs disestablished in 2011
Ironi Jatt
Ironi Jatt
2011 disestablishments in Israel
Sport in Umm al-Fahm